Macaíba is a microregion in the Brazilian state of Rio Grande do Norte.

Municipalities 
The microregion consists of the following municipalities:
 Ceará-Mirim
 Macaíba
 Nísia Floresta
 São Gonçalo do Amarante

References

Microregions of Rio Grande do Norte